The Wedding is a defining work of Polish drama written at the turn of the 20th century by Stanisław Wyspiański. It describes the perils of the national drive toward self-determination following the two unsuccessful uprisings against the Partitions of Poland, in November 1830 and January 1863. The plot is set at the wedding of a member of Kraków intelligentsia (the Bridegroom), and his peasant Bride. Their class-blurring union follows a fashionable trend among friends of the playwright from the modernist Young Poland movement.

Wyspiański's play was based on a real-life event: the wedding of his contemporary, Lucjan Rydel at St. Mary's Basilica in Kraków, followed by the wedding reception in the village of Bronowice.

Plot summary

A poet marries a peasant girl and their wedding reception follows.

The celebration of the marriage moves from the church to the villager's house. In the rooms adjoining that of the wedding reception, guests continually get into arguments, make love, or simply rest from their merriment, dancing and feasting. Interspersed with the real guests are the ghosts of well-known personas from Polish history and culture, who represent the guilty consciences of the living. The two groups begin a series of dialogues. The wedding guests are hypnotized by a rosebush cane straw-wrap (Chochoł) who comes to life and joins the party from the farmhouse garden. (Offending a chochoł (according to folk beliefs) was associated with the danger that the creature would play tricks).  The "Poet" is visited successively by the "Black Knight" (a symbol of the nation's past military glory), the "Journalist", then by the court jester "Stańczyk" who's a conservative political sage; and by the "Ghost of Wernyhora" (a paradigm of leadership for Poland). Wernyhora presents the Host with a golden horn symbolizing the national mission, and calls the Polish people to a revolt. One of the farm hands is dispatched to sound the horn at each corner of Poland, but he loses the horn soon after. Thus, the wedding guests, who symbolize the nation, waste their chance at national freedom. They keep on dancing "the way it's played for them" (a Polish folk proverb) like puppets, failing in their ultimate mission.

Influences
A defining work of Polish drama written at the turn of the 20th century, staged many times, this drama has had much influence on Polish culture. It was made into a movie with the same title by the award-winning Polish film director, Andrzej Wajda, in 1972.

See also
Young Poland
Theatre of Poland

References

Polish plays
1901 plays
Polish-language plays
Plays set in Poland
Plays set in the 19th century
Works by Stanisław Wyspiański
Cultural depictions of Stańczyk
Polish plays adapted into films